The term "Hendo" may refer to the following:

The nickname of various people with the "Henderson" surname, including the following:
Dan Henderson (born 1970), an American mixed martial artist and Olympic wrestler
Dean Henderson (Born 1997), an English football goalkeeper
Jordan Henderson (born 1990), an English football player
A bachelorette party in U.K., Irish, & Canadian vernacular,  a.k.a. "Hen(s) do"
Hendo language, a Bantu language indigenous to Dekese territory in the Democratic Republic of the Congo
Hendo Hover, an American hoverboard company